Diogo da Silva Farias also known as Diogo Acosta (born 13 June 1990) is a Brazilian footballer who plays for Emirates as a forward.

Career
Incheon United signed him in January 2013. During the 2013 season, he has scored 7 goals in 32 games. He rejoined in 2014 on loan. He joined the Tunisian football club Étoile Sportive du Sahel during the 2015 summer transfer window on a three-year contract.

In the Summer of 2019, he joined J League side Vegalta Sendai.

Club career statistics

Honours

Club
Étoile Sportive du Sahel
 Tunisian Ligue : 2015-2016
 Tunisian Cup (1): 2014–15.
 CAF Confederation Cup (1): 2015.

References

External links
 

 

1990 births
Living people
Association football forwards
Brazilian footballers
Brazilian expatriate footballers
Avaí FC players
Incheon United FC players
Étoile Sportive du Sahel players
Dibba FC players
Al-Khor SC players
Vegalta Sendai players
Emirates Club players
K League 1 players
Campeonato Brasileiro Série B players
UAE Pro League players
Qatar Stars League players
J1 League players
UAE First Division League players
Expatriate footballers in South Korea
Brazilian expatriate sportspeople in South Korea
Expatriate footballers in Tunisia
Brazilian expatriate sportspeople in Tunisia
Expatriate footballers in the United Arab Emirates
Brazilian expatriate sportspeople in the United Arab Emirates
Expatriate footballers in Qatar
Brazilian expatriate sportspeople in Qatar
Expatriate footballers in Japan
Brazilian expatriate sportspeople in Japan